The Dream is a 1911 short film, one reel, produced and released by the Independent Moving Pictures Company (IMP) and directed by Thomas H. Ince and George Loane Tucker. It starred Mary Pickford and her husband Owen Moore after they left working at the Biograph Company. This film is preserved at the Library of Congress, a rare survivor from Pickford's IMP period. It appears on the Milestone Films DVD of Pickford's 1918 feature Amarilly of Clothes-Line Alley.

Plot
The film opens in a fancy restaurant where the husband and a woman who is not his wife are polishing off a bottle of wine.  Cut to home, where a dejected wife sits at the dining room table waiting for her husband.  She briefly nods off before rousing and checking the wall clock indicating that it's getting late.  Cut back to the fancy restaurant, where the husband settles the check with a large wad of bills.  The waiter obliges by helping the husband and his lady companion with their hats and coats.  The other woman kicks the husbands hat out of his hand.

Six hours later, the husband strides through the door awakening his wife who is still sitting by the dining room table.  He rebuffs her attempt to take his hat, whereupon she points to the wall clock.  She draws his attention to dinner, which still sits on the dining table.  He upends a few dishes then overturns a chair before collapsing on the sofa, cigarette in hand.  Upset, the wife walks off camera and the scene fades to black.

In the next scene, introduced by a title card stating "HIS DREAM", the wife returns, clad in a form-fitting dress and a plumed hat.  She awakens the husband by jostling his head.  Talking animatedly, she downs a couple of glasses of wine from a decanter on the sideboard and tosses the wineglass on the floor.  She drop-kicks a plate, lights up a cigarette, flicks the match at her husband, and blows smoke in his face.  She pelts him with a pillow that has been lying on the floor, slings her coat over her arm, pulls down the curtains covering the door, and blows the husband a kiss goodbye.  A well-appointed gentleman arrives at the front steps to their house a second or two before the wife steps out the front door and they leave together.

Confounded by what he has just witnessed, the husband grabs his hat and coat and leaves.  The wife and her gentleman caller arrive by taxi at the fancy restaurant where they are shown to the same table the husband had occupied earlier.  The husband arrives hot on their heels, briefly considers confronting them, but then flees, distressed by the whole affair.  He stumbles out into the street before returning home.  There he rants wildly, repeatedly grasping his forehead before settling down to compose a letter which reads in part "You're not the woman I supposed you were."  Stumbling to the sideboard, he pulls out a small revolver from a drawer, points it at his abdomen, pulls the trigger, and collapses spasmodically on the sofa.

In the next scene, introduced by a title card stating "HIS AWAKENING", he falls off the sofa and stands up, clutching his abdomen.  His wife enters the scene, this time reclad in her modest attire, and startles him.  He recounts his vivid experience, she comforts him and helps him realize it was all just a dream.  While she turns her attention to preparing dessert on the dining room table, he pulls his address book from his suitcoat pocket and shreds it.  Reconciled, they embrace and then settle down to eat the confection.

Cast
Mary Pickford as Nell Herbert
Owen Moore as Will Herbert
William Robert Daly
Charles Arling 
Lottie Pickford as Bess

References

External links
The Dream at IMDb.com
allrovi listing

1911 films
American silent short films
American black-and-white films
Films directed by Thomas H. Ince
Films directed by George Loane Tucker
Independent Moving Pictures films
Films produced by Carl Laemmle
1910s American films